Shauna (Irish: Seána) is an Irish female given name. It is the female version of the male names Shawn or Sean, both of which are in turn derived from John.

People named Shauna
 Shauna Adix (1932–1998), American educator and administrator at the University of Utah
 Shauna Anderson, American restaurateur, author, historian, and businesswoman
 Shauna Burns, American singer, songwriter, pianist
 Shauna Cooper, American psychologist and academic
 Shauna Coxsey, English professional rock climber
 Shauna Cross, American roller derby athlete
 Shauna Gambill, American beauty queen
 Shauna Grant, American nude model and pornographic actress
 Shauna Howe, American murder victim
 Shauna Lowry, Northern Irish TV presenter
 Shauna Macdonald, Scottish actress
 Shauna MacDonald, Canadian actress and radio announcer
 Shauna Robertson, Canadian film producer
 Shauna Rohbock, American soldier, Olympic bobsledder, and former soccer player
 Shauna Rolston, Canadian cellist
 Shauna Sand, American actress and Playboy model
 Shauna Singh Baldwin, Canadian-American novelist
 Shauna Willis, Australian television presenter

Given names
Irish feminine given names